Tomobrachyta is a genus of beetles in the family Cerambycidae, containing the following species:

 Tomobrachyta jenisi Adlbauer, 2001
 Tomobrachyta nigroplagiata Fairmaire, 1887

References

Dorcasominae